Cefn may refer to:

Places
Cefn (community), in Wrexham county borough, Wales
Cefn Mawr, a large village in the community of Cefn
Cefn Cribwr, a village in Bridgend county borough, Wales
Cefn Fault, a geological fault in Wales
Cefn Glas, an area of Bridgend, Wales
Cefnllys or Cefn Llys, an abandoned ghost village, formerly a medieval castle town and borough, near Llandrindod Wells, Powys
Cefnllys Castle

Sport
Cefn Druids A.F.C., a football club based in Cefn Mawr, playing in the Cymru Alliance.
F.C. Cefn, a football club based in Cefn Mawr, playing in the Welsh National League (Wrexham Area) Premier Division

Other uses
Cefn quarry, a slate quarry near Cilgerran, Wales